Wonderland is an Australian television drama. It was created by Jo Porter and Sarah Walker. It premiered on Ten on 21 August 2013. Set in Wonderland, a unique and chaotic apartment building on the doorstep of one of Australia’s most beautiful beaches; join a group of mixed-up twenty-somethings as they navigate the humorous and sometimes painful minefield of love, sex and friendship. On 26 October 2015, it was announced that Wonderland had been cancelled after it "failed to find a sufficient audience".

Series overview

Episodes

Season 1 (2013)

Season 2 (2014)

Season 3 (2015)

Ratings

References

Lists of Australian drama television series episodes